Amphigerontia bifasciata is a yellowish-black coloured species of Psocoptera from Psocidae family that can be found in Great Britain and Ireland. They can also be found in Austria, Belgium, Croatia, Denmark, Finland, France, Germany, Hungary, Italy, Latvia, Luxembourg, Norway, Poland, Romania, Sweden, Switzerland, and the Netherlands.

Habitat
The species feeds on introduced conifers and plants such as:
Beech
Birch
Bird cherry
Broom
Gorse
Hawthorn
Larch
Marram grass
Oak
Pine
Rowan
Sallow
Willow
Yew

References

Psocidae
Insects described in 1799
Psocoptera of Europe